Fazila Ikwaput (born 15 September, 1995 ) is an Ugandan footballer who plays for Uganda women's national football team.

Club career 
Ikwaput in 2017–18 Indian Women's League season played for Gokulam Kerala FC (women) and she scored 5 goals for her team. And in the same year she becomes first Ugandan female footballer to play at UEFA Champions' League Group Stages with Kazakhstan club BIIK Kazygurt. Fazila is presently playing for Omonoia Women FC in Cyprus.

International goals
Scores and results list Uganda goal tally first

References

External links

1997 births
Living people
Ugandan women's footballers
Women's association football forwards
BIIK Kazygurt players
Gokulam Kerala FC Women players
Uganda women's international footballers
Ugandan expatriate women's footballers
Ugandan expatriate sportspeople in India
Expatriate women's footballers in India
Ugandan expatriate sportspeople in Kazakhstan
Expatriate women's footballers in Kazakhstan
Indian Women's League players